Garennes-sur-Eure (literally Garennes on Eure) is a commune in the Eure department in northern France. The 19th-century French painter Alfred-Henri Bramtot (1852–1894) died in Garennes-sur-Eure.

Population

See also
Communes of the Eure department

References

External links

Official site

Communes of Eure